Finders Keepers, Lovers Weepers! is a 1968 film by Russ Meyer. The story involves the goings-on at a topless go-go bar on the Sunset Strip. Meyer himself makes an appearance in this film. The composition Finlandia by Jean Sibelius is used in one of the film's love scenes.

Plot
Paul, the owner of a strip club bar on the Sunset Strip in Los Angeles, is taken home after being knocked out at a brothel, whose madam sends two thieves to Paul's club to rob the place while he is unconscious.

When the star dancer at the bar quits, Paul's wife Kelly fills in for her. The bartender Ray then seduces her and takes her to his home, and the thieves Cal and Feeny begin working on cracking the safe. When Paul comes to and cannot find his wife at home, he goes to the club, where the thieves are engaged in their work.

Paul manages to kill the two robbers after Claire has been killed and Ray seriously wounded.

Cast
Anne Chapman as Kelly
Paul Lockwood as Paul
Gordon Wescourt as Ray
Duncan McLeod as Cal
Robert Rudelson as Feeny
Lavelle Roby as Claire
Jan Sinclair as Christiana
Joey Duprez as Joy
Nick Wolcuff as Nick
Pam Collins as Vickie Roberts
John Furlong

Reception
The Los Angeles Times said the film was "not much different from his [Meyer's] previous efforts... Meyer has trouble keeping abreast, so to speak, of the times. This is because Meyer has such a clean mind for a man who makes dirty movies... his films seem positively healthy alongside much of the current Hollywood and European product."

The New York Times thought the film was "no longer particularly erotic."

References

External links
 
Finders Keepers Loves Weepers at TCMDB
 

1968 films
Films directed by Russ Meyer
1960s English-language films
1968 crime films
American crime films
1960s American films